Jumping the Tracks may refer to:

 Jumping the Tracks (+/- album), 2014
 Jumping the Tracks (The Scabs album), 1991